Xumo Play (formerly Xumo) is an American over-the-top internet television service owned by Comcast. Founded in 2011, it offers a free ad-supported streaming television (FAST) and advertising video on demand (AVOD) service that primarily offers a selection of programming content licensed directly from various content distributors. The service's operations are based in the Los Angeles suburb of Irvine, California. As of October 2020, the service has 24 million monthly active users.

History
Xumo was founded in 2011 as a joint venture between the Viant Technology subsidiary of Meredith Corporation (then the parent company of Myspace) and Panasonic.

In 2015, only Vizio and Panasonic offered the service. Other manufacturers added Xumo in 2016, including LG Electronics and Funai. As of May 2016, 78 channels were offered, with a total of 100 planned. The primary target audience was described as millennials who are not satisfied with multichannel television offerings.

In February 2016, Time Inc. acquired Viant. The Vanderhook brothers began the company in 1999 as advertisementbanners.com, changing the name to Interactive Media Holdings in 2003 and Viant in 2015.

By July 2018, the Android app was live, available for download at the Google Play Store. By June 2019, according to CEO Colin Petrie-Norris, Xumo was available in over 35 million American households via a multi-screen distribution network of smart TVs, mobile, web, and streaming boxes. Xumo does not require a set-top box or dongle because TVs include it in a manner similar to Roku. Channel Plus from LG Electronics for LG Smart TVs with WebOS uses Xumo to recommend programs and provide advertising sold by Viant on some channels.

Xumo has the capability to learn what users watch, adding frequently viewed channels and programs at the top of lists.

On February 25, 2020, Comcast announced it would purchase Xumo from the Panasonic/Viant joint venture for an undisclosed sum. The acquisition of the service—which will continue to operate as an independent business, albeit within Comcast's cable television division—stems mainly from Xumo's partnerships with smart TV manufacturers (including LG, Panasonic, and Vizio), which would allow Comcast to use Xumo's placement to market or showcase Xfinity and other Comcast services as well as use its technology to develop additional streaming platforms. The company plans to add content from the NBCUniversal programming library and the company's various television networks as well as use it to upsell Peacock, akin to ViacomCBS's utilization of Pluto TV to offer content from its cable networks following the former Viacom's purchase of the competitor of 2019.

In April 2022, Comcast announced that it would contribute Xumo to a new joint venture with Charter Communications, which will also include retail sales of streaming devices and smart TVs using Comcast's X1 platform. It was announced in November 2022 that this joint venture would retain the Xumo name, with the streaming service to be slightly rebranded as Xumo Play in the future to accompany other Xumo products (such as Xumo Stream Box and Xumo TV).

Programming
Xumo is structured similarly to the pay television model, offering its content as designated channels categorized by program content type into 12 channel tiers:
 News – consisting of mainstream news and opinion channels, as well as partisan, commentary-based outlets reflecting progressive and conservative viewpoints.
 TV & Movies – general entertainment and movie channels.
 Sports – includes live and previously-aired events, sporting news and analysis programs.
 Kids & Family – channels aimed at children and family audiences.
 Food, Drink and Travel – culinary and travel-oriented lifestyle channels.
 Comedy – comedy-based channels, consisting of curated viral video and digital content services.
 Entertainment – consisting of special-interest and viral video-based entertainment channels.
 Lifestyle – lifestyle, travel and home shopping channels
 Pop Culture – entertainment news, science, technology, sci-fi, curated video and geek culture-oriented channels.
 Science & Tech – science, technology and educational documentary channels.
 Music – consisting of music videos and video concerts.
 Fashion – style-oriented channels.

As of February 1, 2020, Xumo carries over 190 channels packaging content acquired through various syndication and digital content deals. Current content partnerships for the service include the sister company NBCUniversal, A&E Networks, Abrams Media, Advance Publications, CNET, Condé Nast, FBE, FilmRise, Fox Corporation, Fremantle, Jukin Media, Kabillion, Katz Networks, Meredith Corporation, NowThis, Paramount Global, PocketWatch, Refinery29, Stingray Group, This Old House Ventures, Time USA, LLC, Vin Di Bona Productions, and Warner Bros. Discovery.

Traditional television channels whose direct or curated feeds are offered on Xumo include History, Fuse, USA Network (plus sister network Syfy, E!, CNBC, MSNBC and Sky News), NASA TV, MTV (plus sister network Showtime, VH1 and Nickelodeon), Discovery Channel, CNN (plus sister network HLN, HBO and Cartoon Network), Euronews, Bloomberg Television, Newsmax TV, Newsy, Fox News (and sister network Fox Business), Home Shopping Network (HSN), QVC, Jewelry Television, Reelz, Shop LC, BeIN Sports Xtra, and Stadium. AVOD services whose feeds are carried on Xumo include NBC News Now, ABC News Live, CBSN (plus sister network CBS Sports HQ and ET Live), Cheddar News, TYT Network (structured as a hybrid SVOD/AVOD service, but offered by Xumo as an AVOD offering), Nosey, Dove Channel, Law & Crime, Fubo Sports Network and People TV.

Availability
Xumo content can be streamed through a number of desktop, mobile and internet-connected TV platforms including: Android and Apple iOS/iPadOS devices, Chromecast, Android TV, Apple TV, Xfinity Flex, Amazon Fire TV, Roku, Cox Contour Stream Player, LG Channel Plus and LG Channels set models, and Smart TV models manufactured by Vizio, Panasonic, Sanyo, Philips, Magnavox, Samsung, Hisense and Sharp Corporation. Outside of the contiguous United States, Xumo and its supported apps are currently available on LG Smart TV models powering its Channel Plus and LG Channels platforms distributed in Canada (on Channel Plus platforms running WebOS 3.5 or above), Mexico, Brazil, France, Germany, Spain, Italy and the United Kingdom (on LG smart TVs running WebOS 4.5 or above).

References

External links 
 
 
 

Advertising video on demand
Companies based in Irvine, California
Internet television streaming services
Comcast subsidiaries
Internet properties established in 2011
2011 establishments in California
American companies established in 2011
2020 mergers and acquisitions